Anthony Robert "Tony" Deyo is an American stand-up comedian. In 2013, he made his late-night television debut on Conan.  Just a few months later, he made a second television appearance on The Late Late Show with Craig Ferguson.  He has performed at the HBO Aspen Comedy Festival, and can be heard on SiriusXM Satellite Radio.

In 2019, Deyo recorded his third album, "Secret Headliner", in front of an unexpecting audience, who had no idea who he was.  “The true test of a joke,” Deyo said of the experimental album, “is will it make strangers laugh? Does it work when no one has any idea who you are?”

Discography
 I’m Telling You For The First Time (2011)
 Comedy Road Trip (2016)
 Secret Headliner (2019)

Filmography

References

External links
 
 
 Tony Deyo on Twitter
 Tony Deyo on Instagram
 Tony Deyo on Facebook

1973 births
Living people
People from Buena Vista, Virginia
American male comedians
American stand-up comedians
21st-century American comedians
Comedians from Utah
Comedians from Virginia